The Hollywood Post Alliance Award for Outstanding Sound – Television is an annual award, given by the Hollywood Post Alliance (HPA), to post-production workers in the film and television industry, in this case sound. It was first awarded in 2006 and has been presented every year since. From 2006 to 2009, the category was titled Hollywood Post Alliance Award for Outstanding Audio Post – Television.

Winners and nominees

2000s
Outstanding Audio Post – Television

2010s
Outstanding Sound – Television

Programs with multiple wins

2 awards
 CSI: Crime Scene Investigation (CBS)
 House (Fox)

Programs with multiple nominations

6 nominations
 Game of Thrones (HBO)

3 nominations
 Banshee (Cinemax)
 CSI: Crime Scene Investigation (CBS)
 Homeland (Showtime)

2 nominations
 Fringe (Fox)
 Lost (ABC)
 House (Fox)
 House of Cards (Netflix)
 Yellowstone (Paramount Network)

See also

 List of American television awards

References

American television awards
Film sound awards